Lima Township is one of eleven townships in LaGrange County, Indiana, United States. As of the 2010 census, its population was 2,507 and it contained 1,008 housing units.

History
Lima Township was established in 1832.

John Badlam Howe Mansion, St. James Memorial Chapel, Star Milling and Electric Company Historic District, and Samuel P. Williams House are listed on the National Register of Historic Places.

Geography

References

External links
 Indiana Township Association
 United Township Association of Indiana

Townships in LaGrange County, Indiana
Townships in Indiana